The 2019 PSL Invitational Cup was the fourth conference and third indoor volleyball tournament of the Philippine Super Liga's seventh season. The tournament commenced on September 23, 2019 at the Strike Gymnasium in Bacoor, Cavite with opening ceremonies held on September 28, 2019 at Ynares Sports Arena in Pasig.

Teams

Preliminary round

Round 1

Pool A

|}

|}

Pool B

|}

|}

Round 2

Pool C

|}

|}

Pool D

|}

|}

Playoffs

Semifinals

|}

Bronze match

|}

Finals

|}

Final standing

Individual awards

Venues
 Filoil Flying V Arena 
 Ynares Sports Arena

"Spike on Tour" venues
 Strike Gymnasium - Bacoor, Cavite
 Santa Rosa Multi-Purpose Complex
 Malolos Sports & Convention Center
 Caloocan Sports Complex

Broadcast partners
ESPN 5: 5 Plus, One Sports (SD and HD), ESPN5.com, ESPN Player (Online)

References

External links
PSL website

Invitational
2019 in women's volleyball
PSL